Chekhov/Chekov (masculine) or Chekhova (feminine) is a Russian surname, referring to someone from Czechia. Notable people with the surname include:

Alexander Chekhov (1855-1913), older brother of Anton Chekhov
Anton Chekhov (1860–1904), Russian writer
Maria Chekhova (1863–1957), sister of Anton Chekhov
Maria Chekhova (feminist) (1866–1934), Russian feminist, suffragette and educator.
Michael Chekhov (1891–1955), Russian actor, director, and theorist, Anton's nephew and student of Stanislavski
Nikolay Chekhov (1858–1889), painter and brother of Anton Chekhov
Olga Chekhova (1897–1980), Russian actress, wife of Mikhail
Valery Chekhov (born 1955), Russian chess grandmaster

Fictional characters
Pavel Chekov, Star Trek character
Chekov, fictional character in Stargate SG-1

Russian-language surnames
Ethnonymic surnames